Siwapong Jarernsin (born July 22, 1985) is a Thai professional footballer who plays as a midfielder for Thai League 3 club Mueang Kon D United.

Honours
Krabi
 Thai League 3 runners-up: 2021–22
 Thai League 3 Southern Region winners: 2021–22

External links

1985 births
Living people
Siwapong Jarernsin
Siwapong Jarernsin
Association football midfielders
Siwapong Jarernsin
Siwapong Jarernsin
Siwapong Jarernsin
Siwapong Jarernsin
Siwapong Jarernsin
Siwapong Jarernsin
Siwapong Jarernsin
Siwapong Jarernsin
Siwapong Jarernsin
Siwapong Jarernsin
Siwapong Jarernsin
Siwapong Jarernsin
Siwapong Jarernsin
Siwapong Jarernsin